Narodny (masculine), Narodnaya (feminine), or Narodnoye (neuter) may refer to:
Narodny Municipal Okrug, a municipal okrug of Nevsky District of the federal city of St. Petersburg, Russia
Moscow Narodny Bank Limited
Moscow Narodny Bank (Moscow)
Moscow Narodny Bank (London)
Mount Narodnaya, the highest peak of the Ural Mountains, Russia
Narodnaya, a brand of Russian vodka
Narodnoye, a rural locality (a selo) in Ternovsky District of Voronezh Oblast, Russia

See also
Narodnoye Pravo
Narodnoye Slovo
Narodnaya Volya (disambiguation)
Narodnaya Gazeta